Sabyasachi Mishra (born 6 October 1985) is an Indian actor known for his work in Odia Cinema. He has also acted in some Bengali,Telugu & Tamil films. He is referred to as "Superstar of Ollywood". Pagala Premi was his first movie, for which he earned an Odisha State Film Awards for Best Actor. Sabyasachi got his second state award for Emiti Bi Prema Hue. He won the Filmfare Awards East as best actor for Mu Eka Tumara in 2013.

Sabyasachi has signed many brand endorsement deals. He was selected as the brand ambassador for IPL team Deccan Chargers, Odisha Tennis Premier League, Cricket For The Blind in India, etc. to promote sports. He along with Archita Sahu were the anchors at the opening ceremony of the 2018 FIH Men's Hockey World Cup hosted at Bhubaneswar.

Sabyasachi is also involved in social work. He has become very much popular during the COVID-19 pandemic by helping the migrant workers & needy people.

Career

Sabyasachi began his career by appearing in Music Videos. Director Saroj Satapathy introduced him in a music video for the program Rangarang of Doordarshan Odia (DD-6). Since then he has appeared in more than 200 music videos. During this period he has also appeared in Bhojpuri, Bengali, Chattishgarhi and Punjabi music videos.

Film director Hara Patnaik spotted him performing at a stage show and offered him the movie Pagala Premi. Hara Pattanaik is considered his godfather. Pagala Premi was released on 14 June 2007. His critically acclaimed roles included his anti-hero character in Mu Sapanara Soudagar, the physically challenged Keun Duniaru Asila Bandhu.

In the movie Mu Eka Tumara, Sabyasachi played the character of a boy who can't speak, for which he bagged many awards including Filmfare award. His 2015 released movie Pilata Bigidigala was considered as one of the biggest blockbusters. The Sabyasachi starrer, 2016 March 18 released Hela Mate Prema Jara also got extraordinary response from public and critics. In 2018 "Tokata Fasigala" and in 2019 "Mal Mahu Jiban Mati" were blockbuster movies. He also started singing and did play back singing for both the title songs of "Pilata Bigidigala" and "Hela Mate Prema Jara". His song "Maya re Baya" went viral on social media.

Sabyasachi debuted in the South Indian Film industry with Telugu movie Neerajanam. His upcoming Telugu movie is "Adi Oka Idile".

Personal life

Family
Sabyasachi was born to Surendra Prasad Mishra, a civil servant and Sushama Mishra, a writer. He has a brother, Soumya Kanta Mishra, who works as a Telecom Engineer. He fluently speaks Odia and Telugu. He was married to Seema Mishra (2008-2015). Following his divorce from Seema Mishra, he married Odia film actress Archita Sahu on 1 March 2021.

Education
Sabyasachi is an Engineer who completed his B.Tech. in Electronics and Telecommunications from the Silicon Institute of Technology, a private college in Odisha. He was also placed in Infosys but later he left to pursue his interest in film industry.

Filmography
 2007 – Pagala Premi
 2008 – Mu Sapanara Soudagar
 2008 – To Bina Bhala Lagena
 2008 – Bande Utkala Janani
 2008 – Mate Ani Dela Lakhe Phaguna
 2009 – Dhire Dhire Prema Hela
 2009 – Pagala Karichi Paunji Tora
 2009 – Kou Duniaru Asila Bandhu
 2009 – Tu Mori Pain
 2009 – Dream Girl
 2009 – Love Dot Com
 2009 – Prem Rogi (Guest appearance)
 2010 – Tora Mora Jodi Sundara
 2010 – Megha Sabari Re Asiba Pheri
 2010 – Sasura Ghara Zindabad
 2010 – Dil Tate Deichi
 2010 – Aakhi Palakare Tu
 2011 – Chatire Lekhichi Tori Naa
 2011 – Dosti
 2011 – Chandini, I Miss You
 2012 - Kemiti E Bandhana
 2012 – Emiti Bi Prema Hue
 2012 – Kebe Tume Nahan Kebe Mu Nahin
 2012 – Om Sai Ram
 2013 – Mu Eka Tumara
 2014 – Smile Please
 2015 – Pilata Bigidigala
 2016 – Hela Mate Prema Jara
 2016 – Bye Bye Dubai
 2016 - Chhati Tale Ding Dong
 2017 – Neerajanam (Telugu) 
 2017 – Sitaramula Kalyanam Chuthamu Raarandi (Telugu)
 2017 – Sita Ramanka Bahaghara Kali Jugare
 2018 - Tokata Fasigala
 2018 - 4 Idiots
 2019 - Abhimana
 2019 - Mall Mahu Jibana Mati
 2019 - Raktomukhi Neela(Bengali)
 2020 - Lucky Ra Lockdown Love Story
 2022 - Nadhir Dhinna (Tamil)
 2023 - Puskara

Awards

References

External links

 
 
 
Sabyasachi Mishra Biography In Odia

1984 births
Living people
Indian male film actors
Actors in Odia cinema
People from Odisha
Cinema of Odisha
21st-century Indian male actors